Karnataka are a Welsh progressive rock band formed in 1997 by Ian Jones (bass/acoustic guitar), Jonathan Edwards (keyboards) and Rachel Jones (vocals). The band started as a project to record songs in Ian's home studio, that had been written and performed by Jonathan, Rachel and Ian in earlier bands. The project was augmented by additional musicians, Paul Davies (electric guitars) and Gavin Griffiths (drums), who had played with other members of Karnataka in earlier bands. At the end of the recording the decision was made to continue the project as a band. The name Karnataka was chosen by the band, from a suggestion by Ian, following his trips to that state of India.

Debut album
The five-piece recorded what would become their debut album, Karnataka in 1997. In the beginning, the band had no thought of actually releasing the album – they made the recording for their own pleasure. As they started to play live shows in their new configuration, however, word of mouth ensured that an increasing number of people started asking for copies.

It was recommended to the band that they send a copy of the album to Martin Hudson at the Classic Rock Society. Martin gave the band their first break by positively reviewing the album in the society's magazine, and then offering them a gig for the Classic Rock Society in Rotherham, supporting the Genesis tribute band ReGenesis in 1999. The show was a success and Karnataka were offered another support with Jump in October 1999. Encouraged, the band had already started writing the material that would eventually appear on their second album, The Storm.

The Storm
The Storm was recorded between August–November 1999 in Ian's studio. The album was then mixed at Rockfield Studios in Mounmouthshire, Wales—a studio used by such notable bands as Rush, Hawkwind, Queen and Clannad. Further live performances brought the band to the attention of record company Voiceprint through whom they are now distributed. The band toured the UK extensively with the new album, culminating in a show before an audience of die-hards at London's Mean Fiddler, which was filmed and subsequently released on DVD under licence to Classic Rock Productions. The DVD, entitled simply In Concert, was well received by fans but frustrated the band, who still felt that the results did not fully reflect their acclaimed live performances.

Delicate Flame of Desire
The In Concert DVD did, however, feature some new material the band was working on for their third album, although the songs were destined to change a little before they were recorded in the sessions for what was to become the band's breakthrough album. Delicate Flame of Desire, the band's third album, was recorded with producer Steve Evans and mixed by Joe Gibb. The album brought the band's music to a much wider audience with Radio 2 airplay and widespread media coverage. This album was the only Karnataka studio album to feature new member, Anne-Marie Helder, on flute and backing vocals. She had previously appeared on the band's In Concert DVD as one of three guest backing vocalists.

An in-depth interview with Ian Jones, Jonathan Edwards and Rachel Jones was conducted by Jon Hinchliffe in 2002, shortly before the release of. 'Delicate Flame of Desire'. In the interview, all three talk extensively about the origins of the band, the writing process and the dynamics of how the band operates.

Strange Behaviour
Shortly after the release of Delicate Flame of Desire, Karnataka were invited to play their first shows overseas: indeed one of their first shows in the US was filmed and released on DVD as Live in the USA, again through Classic Rock Productions. The band were also working on more new material, some of which was premiered over the course of 2003 and 2004, as the band continued to expand their fanbase and received increasingly positive reviews. A double live album, Strange Behaviour, was released in mid-2004 to accompany what was to be the band's final tour with the existing line-up.

The live album is particularly notable for containing two previously unreleased new songs  - Talk To Me and These Dreams Are Over.

Although another tour of the UK was in the early planning stages, in August 2004 the band's website was updated with a notice that due to unforeseen personal circumstances, the band had decided not to continue. There followed a period of inactivity, during which the members of the band embarked upon new musical projects.

Ian Jones joined forces with songwriter Steve Evans and guitarist Ian Simmons to record an under the moniker Chasing The Monsoon and would be joined later by Lisa Fury performing vocals.

Rachel Jones decided to take time out from the music business and returned to college, although she appeared on recordings from other bands and occasionally took to the stage as well, most notably with Mostly Autumn.  She subsequently joined Cardiff-based rock band, The Reasoning, as a vocalist in late 2006.

The remaining members of the original line-up of Karnataka, Paul Davies, Jonathan Edwards, and Gavin Griffiths, along with Anne-Marie Helder, formed Panic Room in 2008.

The Gathering Light
Karnataka was then resurrected as a band when Ian Jones started writing with keyboardist Gonzalo Carrera. The new Karnataka featured a line-up consisting of Jones and Carrera along with vocalist Lisa Fury, drummer Louie Palmer, and guitarist Enrico Pinna. This new line-up of the band toured in Spring 2007 playing a selection of fan favourites and four or five new songs to provide a flavour of the work in progress.

Following Palmer's departure from the band later in 2007, Karnataka were joined by Ian Harris, who had previously played with a multitude of acts, including Chris Rea, Mica Paris and Nitin Sawhney.

Work on the band's fourth studio album The Gathering Light continued in 2007 although started in 2005 with all three writers; Ian Jones, Lisa Fury & Gonzalo Carrera. The band continued to tour. This time the old favourites took a back seat to a slew of new material, showcasing the band's confidence in their post-split writing. The tour was very well received, resulting in strong voting for the band and the individual musicians in 2008's Classic Rock Society awards, even though the band had yet to release any recordings with the new line-up.

The fourth Karnataka studio album, The Gathering Light, was finally released in February 2010, although fans who had pre-ordered a special edition of the album received their copies slightly earlier. The band embarked on a string of live dates to promote the album, which had already received some exceptionally positive reviews. It also featured in many music magazines - Classic Rock Society, Get Ready To Rock, Fireworks Magazine with a featured track on the accompanying cd, Dutch Progressive Rock Page, Powerplay Magazine, Musical Discoveries & Where Worlds Collide, inc front page of Classic Rock Society Magazine. The Gathering Light also Winner of Best International Album at the Prog Awards.

"The Gathering Light stands true to Karnataka's heritage, yet illustrates significant artistic growth since the former lineup's Delicate Flame of Desire release six years ago. progressive rock influences are more apparent [...] While their fans have waited a long time for this release, the care taken in the writing, recording and production of The Gathering Light has delivered an outstanding progressive rock album..."

In May 2010, Ian Harris, Gonzalo Carrera and Lisa Fury announced on their websites that due to personal reasons they would be leaving the band. It was announced in October 2010 that Ian Harris would be replaced by former Karnataka drummer Louie Palmer, and in October 2010 multi-instrumentalist Colin Mold was revealed as having joined the band in a new role. In February 2011, it was announced that Hayley Griffiths was the new lead vocalist for the band replacing Lisa Fury. Hayley was previously a lead vocalist with global phenomena Riverdance and Michael Flatley's Lord of the Dance.  The band's new lineup was completed in March 2011, when Cagri Tozluoglu was announced as the band's new keyboard player. In Sept 2011 the new line-up announced an extensive 15 date tour of the UK would take place early in 2012, subsequently named the "New Light Tour". Due to the second departure of Palmer, the band were joined by session player Matt McDonough for the tour (and continued to tour with the band until 2014). Following the completion of the 2012 tour, Mold departed the band, and was not replaced.

The band filmed and recorded their show at The Met Theatre in Bury on the New Light Tour. The show was enhanced bylights and lasers, and filmed in high definition. The live DVD and was released in late 2012. The band continued to tour this show into 2013.

Secrets of Angels
The band revealed in August 2013 that they were working on a new album. It was revealed on 31 May 2014 that the band had hired drummer Jimmy Pallagrosi as an official replacement for Louie Palmer. The long-awaited album was released on 7 March 2015, with the first copies being available at the concert in Derby and preorders shipped the next week. The album contains 8 tracks, including the title track, a '20-minute epic opus'. Other tracks on the album include Forbidden Dreams, Poison Ivy and Feels Like Home, which were previewed on the Forbidden Dreams tour in 2012/13. The band went on a UK tour starting on 28 February, playing every track from the new album each night.

Dissolution of Secrets of Angels line-up and the future
The band continued to tour the Secrets of Angels album through 2016 and 2017, both in the UK and Europe. A DVD was recorded in London in 2016 and was released in December 2017. 2017 also saw a tour entitled 'End II End', which saw the band perform the albums The Gathering Light and Secrets of Angels in their entirety. Keyboard player Cagri Tozluoglu decided to step down from the band towards the end of 2017, with guitarist Enrico Pinna also indicating he was likely to leave the band to pursue other commitments. Following a concert at the Robin on 3 December, band leader Ian Jones announced on Facebook that the current line up of the band had come to an end and it would likely continue with a new line up.

In February 2018, Ian Jones announced on the band's website that Gonzalo Carrera had rejoined the band, and that they were working together on new material. In August 2018, the band announced new drummer Filippo Galli, and in November 2018 the band announced new vocalist Sertari, as well as special guest guitarist Luke Machin.

Members

Current members
Ian Jones - bass, acoustic guitars, keyboards, percussion (1997–present)
Filippo Galli - drums (2018–present)
Sertari - lead vocals (2018–present)

Touring musician
Luke Machin - guitars (2018-present)

Former members
Paul Davies - guitars (1997–2004)
Jonathan Edwards - keyboards (1997–2004)
Gareth Griffiths - drums, percussion (1997–2004)
Rachel Jones - lead vocals (1997–2004)
Anne-Marie Helder - flute, backing vocals (2003–2004)
Bob Dalton - drums, percussion (2005-2006)
Nick May - guitars (2005-2006)
Lisa Fury - lead vocals (2005–2010)
Louie Palmer - drums, percussion (2006–2007, 2010–2011)
Enrico Pinna - guitars (2006–2017)
Ian Harris - drums, percussion (2007–2010)
Colin Mold - guitars, keyboards, violin, backing vocals (2010–2012)
Hayley Griffiths - lead vocals (2011–2017)
Cagri Tozluoglu - keyboards (2011–2017)
Jimmy Pallagrosi - drums, percussion (2014–2017)
Gonzalo Carrera - keyboards (2005–2010, 2018–2022)

Former touring musician
Matt McDonough - drums, percussion (2011–2014)

Lineups

Timeline

Discography

Studio
Karnataka (1998)
The Storm (2000)
Delicate Flame of Desire (2003)
The Gathering Light (2010)
Secrets of Angels (2015)

Live
Strange Behaviour (2004)
New Light Live in Concert (2012)
Secrets of Angels Live in Concert (2018)

Video
In Concert (2002)
Live in the USA (2003)
New Light Live in Concert (2012)
Secrets of Angels Live in Concert (2018)

References

External links
Official website
Official MySpace page
Official Reverbnation page

Welsh hard rock musical groups
British progressive rock groups
Musical groups from Swansea
Musical groups established in 1997